Brigitte Jaumard is a computer scientist and expert on mathematical programming. She earned a doctorate in 2006 from ENSTA ParisTech under the supervision of Michel Minoux, after previously teaching at Polytechnique Montréal. She is a professor of computer science and software engineering at Concordia University, where she is the holder of an Honorary Concordia Research Chair in Optimization of Communication Networks.

References

External links

Canadian women computer scientists
Canadian computer scientists
Academic staff of Concordia University
Year of birth missing (living people)
Living people